The 1976 New South Wales Open, also known by its sponsored name Marlboro New South Wales Open, was a combined men's and women's tennis tournament played on outdoor grass courts at the White City Stadium in Sydney, Australia. The men's was part of the 1977 Colgate-Palmolive Grand Prix circuit. It was the 84th edition of the event and was held from 26 December 1976 through 1 January 1977. The singles titles were won by Kerry Reid and 33-year-old Tony Roche. It was Roche's fourth singles title after 1967, 1969 and 1974. Roche won AUS$13,500 first-prize money while Reid's title was rewarded with AUS$5,000 prize money.

Finals

Men's singles
 Tony Roche defeated  Dick Stockton 6–3, 3–6, 6–3, 6–4

Women's singles
 Kerry Reid defeated  Dianne Fromholtz 3–6, 6–3, 6–2

Men's doubles
 Syd Ball /  Kim Warwick defeated  Mark Edmondson /  John Marks 6–3, 6–4

Women's doubles
 Helen Gourlay Cawley /  Betsy Nagelsen defeated  Dianne Fromholtz /  Renáta Tomanová 6–4, 6–1

References

External links
 Official website
 Association of Tennis Professionals (ATP) tournament profile
 International Tennis Federation (ITF) men's tournament details
 Women's Tennis Association (WTA) tournament profile

Sydney International
NSW
Marlboro NSW Open
Marlboro NSW Open
Marlboro NSW Open
Marlboro NSW Open
Marlboro NSW Open, 1976